This is a very incomplete list of Gaelic footballers who have played at senior level for the Kerry county team.

List of players

B
 Eamonn Breen: Retired 1999

C
 Colm Cooper
 Peter Crowley: Until 2021, league debut in 2011, championship debut in 2012

D
 Kieran Donaghy: 2005–2018, 69 championship appearances

E
 John Egan
 Shane Enright: 10 years, until 2020

F
 Maurice Fitzgerald
 Éamonn Fitzmaurice: Until 2007

G
 Paul Galvin: 12 years, until 2014

K
 Brendan Kealy
 Brian Kelly: Until 2020
 Tim Kennelly

L
 Bomber Liston
 Jonathan Lyne: Until 2020, league debut v Cork in 2011

M
 Anthony Maher: 2008–2018
 Ogie Moran
 Seamus Moynihan: 14 years, until 2006

O
 Mick O'Connell
 James O'Donoghue: Until 2022
 Declan O'Keeffe: 1995–2007, debut v Donegal in National League
 Aidan O'Mahony: until 2017, 70 championship appearances and 85 league appearances
 Marc Ó Sé
 Páidí Ó Sé
 Tomás Ó Sé
 Jack O'Shea
 Darran O'Sullivan: 14 years until 2018, championship debut in 2005
 Declan O'Sullivan: until 2014

P
 Ger Power

S
 Bryan Sheehan: 2005–2017, scored 6–161 in 66 championship appearances
 Mikey Sheehy
 Mick Spillane
 Pat Spillane
 Tom Spillane

W
 Donnchadh Walsh: 2003–2018
 Tommy Walsh: Until 2021

References

Players
Footballers
 
Lists of inter-county Gaelic football players